Tuya Mountains Provincial Park is a provincial park in British Columbia, Canada, protecting the Tuya Range, a volcanic region at the head of the Tuya River.  The park is located on the north side of Tuya Lake. The park is named for nearby Tuyas, steep-sided, flat-topped types of volcano.

References

Provincial parks of British Columbia
Cassiar Country